Lord Rayleigh (John William Strutt, 3rd Baron Rayleigh,  12 November 1842 – 30 June 1919) was a British physicist and mathematician who is the source of the following terms:

Science and Mathematics
Experiments of Rayleigh and Brace
Rayleigh bandwidth
Rayleigh beamwidth
Rayleigh–Carson reciprocity
Rayl, rayl or Rayleigh 
 Rayleigh–Faber–Krahn inequality
Rayleigh–Jeans law
Rayleigh–Jeans catastrophe
Rayleigh–Ritz method
Rayleigh–Schrödinger perturbation theory
Rayleigh's method of dimensional analysis
Rayleigh criterion
Rayleigh's criterion (thermoacoustics)
Rayleigh differential equation
Rayleigh dissipation function
Rayleigh distance 
Rayleigh distribution
Rayleigh frequency
Rayleigh mixture distribution
Rayleigh fading
Rayleigh's film
Rayleigh flight
Rayleigh's formulas
Rayleigh fractionation
Rayleigh's identity
Rayleigh interferometer
Rayleigh law
Rayleigh–Lorentz pendulum
Rayleigh law on low-field magnetization
Rayleigh length
Rayleigh limit
Rayleigh–Gans approximation
Rayleigh quotient
Rayleigh quotient iteration
Rayleigh's quotient in vibrations analysis
Rayleigh test
Rayleigh theorem
Rayleigh theorem for eigenvalues
Rayleigh scattering
Filtered Rayleigh scattering
Forced Rayleigh scattering
Hyper–Rayleigh scattering
Rayleigh roughness criterion
Rayleigh sky model
Rayleigh–Sommerfeld diffraction theory
Rayleigh wave equation
Rayleigh waves

Fluid mechanics
Rayleigh's criterion
Janzen–Rayleigh expansion
Plateau–Rayleigh instability
Rayleigh–Bénard convection
Rayleigh–Plesset equation
Rayleigh–Taylor instability
Rayleigh's equation (fluid dynamics)
Rayleigh–Kuo criterion
Rayleigh flow
Rayleigh number
Rayleigh problem
Rayleigh Still

Astronomical objects
22740 Rayleigh
Rayleigh  ,  a Martian crater 
Rayleigh (lunar crater)

Others
Rayleigh Medal, awarded  by the Institute of Acoustics
Rayleigh Medal and Prize, awarded  by the Institute of Physics

See also
Rayleigh (disambiguation)

References

Rayleigh